Emily McAsey (born March 14, 1978) is a former Democratic member of the Illinois House of Representatives.  A lawyer and teacher, she defeated Brent Hassert in November 2008 to become the state representative from Illinois's 85th House District.  The district serves a suburban area north of Joliet along Illinois's Interstate 55. McAsey resigned to join her husband who recently accepted a job position out of state.

References

External links
Representative Emily McAsey (D) 85th District at the Illinois General Assembly
By session: 98th, 97th, 96th
Emily McAsey for State Representative
 
Emily McAsey at Illinois House Democrats

Living people
People from Lockport, Illinois
College of William & Mary alumni
Loyola University Chicago alumni
Democratic Party members of the Illinois House of Representatives
Women state legislators in Illinois
1978 births
21st-century American politicians
21st-century American women politicians